In the 1994 season, the National Lacrosse League (then called the Major Indoor Lacrosse League) began naming a Player of the Month. The award is determined by a vote of the general managers and head coaches of the NLL teams.

The first recipient was Buffalo Bandits goaltender Steve Dietrich.

In 1998, the league added the Rookie of the Month award.

Player of the Month

Players listed in italics are retired.

Rookie of the Month
1998-present

References

See also
 National Lacrosse League Weekly Awards
 List of NLL seasons -- contains the winners for each month

 

Monthly